Yusuff Ali Musaliam Veettil Abdul Kader, popularly known as M. A. Yusuff Ali (born 15 November 1955) is a UAE-based Indian businessman and billionaire. He is the Chairman and Managing Director of LuLu Group International, which owns the LuLu Hypermarket chain worldwide and LuLu International Shopping Mall. With an annual turnover of US$7.4 billion, LuLu Group International employs the largest number of Indians outside India. According to Forbes Middle East, Yusuff Ali was ranked No. 1 in Top 100 Indian business owners in the Arab World 2018.

In 2006, he started his large business ventures in India, by starting a convention centre cum hotel at his native place Thrissur, Kerala namely Lulu Convention Centre. In 2013, Yusuff Ali acquired 4.99% of the Thrissur-based Catholic Syrian Bank (CSB) and 4.99% shares of Thrissur based Dhanlaxmi Bank. Also in 2013, he increased his stake in the Aluva-based Federal Bank to 4.47%. In 2014 Yusuff Ali acquired 2% stake of South Indian Bank - another Thrissur based bank.  In 2016, Yusuff Ali purchased the Scotland Yard Building in London. , he held a 9.37% share in Cochin International Airport. He has bought a 10% stake in the UK-based trading firm, East India Company, and a 40% stake in its fine foods subsidiary for around $85 million in total. The Lulu Bolgatty International Convention Centre on Bolghatty Island is one of the largest convention centres in South Asia, along with the third largest Grand Hyatt branded hotel in the same campus. Lulu group's First Mall in India was LuLu International Shopping Mall, Kochi started in 2013, then in  2019, he started shopping mall in India at Triprayar, Thrissur, Kerala, the Y Mall. In October 2021, Lulu group opened their second mall in India, Global Mall, at Rajaji Nagar, Bengaluru, Karnataka. In December 2021, Lulu group opened their third mall in India at Thiruvananthapuram, Kerala. And in July 2022, Lulu group opened their fourth mall in India at Lucknow, Uttar Pradesh.

Early life
Yusuff Ali was born in a Muslim family in Nattika in Thrissur district of Kerala on 15 November 1955. He did his schooling in Karanchira at St. Xavier's High School. He holds a diploma in Business Management and Administration.

After his studies, he left India in 1973 to Abu Dhabi, where his paternal uncle, M K Abdullah, the chairman and the founder of the LuLu Group of Companies, was doing business. He developed the import and wholesale distribution of the group and ventured into the supermarket business by launching Lulu Hypermarket. He started his first Lulu Hypermarket in the 1990s, a time when the UAE's retail sector witnessed a major change, with the traditional groceries and supermarkets yielding place to large neighborhood stores and hypermarkets. While the entry of Continent (now Carrefour) in 1995 changed the face of retail business in Dubai, Yusuff Ali took charge of Abu Dhabi's retail sector by rolling out LuLu Hypermarket.

LuLu Group International
LuLu Group International commenced its operations as a family business venture. After joining the business, Yusuff Ali diversified the business to include import and distribution of frozen products from Europe and the United States. The products were available not only in Abu Dhabi but also in other Emirates. The business was soon expanded to include both food and non-food categories. The group also started cold storages, meat, and food processing plants, large-scale import and distribution to hotel groups, catering companies, and shipping services. By the 1980s, the group had a sizable share of the wholesale and retail food market in the UAE.

The group has grown into an international group with operations spread over three continents. The group's flagship retail chain of LuLu Hypermarkets and Supermarkets is currently rated as one of the major players in the Middle East retail sector with more than 100 stores in Arab states of the Persian Gulf. Apart from the hypermarkets, supermarkets and department stores, the group also owns several shopping malls, namely,  Khalidiyah Mall, Al Raha Mall, Al Wahda Mall, Mushriff Mall, Madinat Zayed Mall, Mazyad Mall, Ramli Mall, RAK Mall, Al Foah Mall, Al Khor Mall, Riyadh Avenue Mall in Saudi Arabia and Oman Avenues Mall spread across the GCC states.

LuLu International Shopping Mall in Kochi, Kerala was opened on 10 March 2013. It is the group's first retail venture in India, and currently the largest shopping mall in India. LuLu International Shopping Mall in Thiruvananthapuram was opened in 2021. The Group has a vast organizational structure of over 40,000 employees, representing 37 different nationalities, out of which more than 25,000 are Indians. Retail business is the mainstay of the Group with operations in major Middle Eastern and African countries like UAE, Oman, Qatar, Kuwait, Yemen, Saudi Arabia, Bahrain, Egypt and Kenya, having Retail Sourcing and manufacturing bases located in Far East, India, Africa and Guangzhou in China. Indian operations mainly include Food Processing, Export of Food & Non food products and convention center with bases in Delhi, Mumbai, Kochi, Thiruvananthapuram, Chennai, Lucknow and Thrissur. Deloitte has ranked the Group as one of the fastest growing retailers in the world.

Philanthropy
Yusuff Ali is very closely involved in many social, charitable and humanitarian activities both in India as well as in the Arab states of the Gulf. He has done various philanthropic activities across the globe. As part of its Global CSR policy, the LuLu Group joined hands with Dubai Cares and adopted schools in Gaza and Nepal. Yusuff Ali contributed and took initiative to open a multi-faith funeral centre for the Indian community in Sharjah that spread across 8.3 acres. He also took initiative to sell and promote organic products grown by the special needs community in UAE through LuLu Hypermarkets Yusuff Ali donated generously towards the Gujarat earthquake, Tsunami Relief Fund in Asia, and Typhoon and flood relief in other parts of the world. He also donated Rs 9.5 crores for relief and rehabilitation of Kerala flood victims in August 2018. He is also actively involved in ensuring the social, economic and religious welfare of expatriate Indians in the Persian Gulf region. He played a major role in finding land for the Christian community in the region to build churches, and secure cremation grounds for the Hindu populace in the Gulf region. M. A. Yusuff Ali also extended help to Indians during the amnesty period in the Persian Gulf when hundreds of Indians lost their livelihood. He helped rehabilitate people who lost their livelihood in the Calicut market fire as well. Yusuff Ali had pledged to donate Rs 50 million for the flood-hit south Indian state of Kerala in the event of the 2019 Kerala floods.

Personal life
He is married, with three children, and lives in Abu Dhabi, UAE. His elder daughter Sabeena is married to billionaire businessman Shamsheer Vayalil. His second daughter Shafeena is married to Adeeb Ahamed who runs Lulu International Exchange and Twenty14 Holdings, the group's hospitality investments division.

On the 11th of April, 2021 the helicopter in which M.A. Yusuff Ali, his wife and three others including the pilots crash landed in a swamp near Kochi, Kerala. Fortunately both were uninjured and were taken to a nearby hospital for first aid. The private helicopter owned by the businessman had suffered a technical glitch due to adverse weather.

Recognition and awards
 2004 – "Commander" title & St. Ephraim Medal by the Patriarch Ignatius Zakka I Iwas of Universal Syriac Orthodox Church.
 2005 – Pravasi Bharatiya Samman in 2005; the highest Indian government award given to non-resident Indians.
 2008 – Padma Shri from the Government of India
 2010 – "Business Man of the Year 2009-10" award instituted by the Kerala State Forum of Bankers' Clubs.
 2012 – Lifetime Achievement Award at the inaugural Indian CEO Awards held in February.
 2012 – Swiss Ambassador's Award 2012 for outstanding efforts in promoting Swiss-UAE relations.
 2012 – "Most Influential Asian Business Leader in the MENA region" award by Forbes Middle East.
 2012 – "Arab Business Leader of the Year 2012" during the third edition of the Global Arab Business Meeting held in Ras Al Khaimah.
2014 – Honorary D. Litt. by Aligarh Muslim University.
 2016 – Was honoured with the archbishop Mar Gregorios Award instituted by the alumni association of Mar Ivanios College, Amicos, for his contribution to the industrial sector in 2016.
 2018 – Honorary doctorate from Middlesex University
 2018 – Honorary doctorate from Mahatma Gandhi University, Kerala
2021 - Was honoured with Abu Dhabi's highest civilian award, Abu Dhabi Award 2021 by HH Sheikh Mohammed Bin Zayed Al Nahyan,Crown Prince of Abu Dhabi.
2021 - Yusuff Ali was granted a long-term residential visa by Qais bin Mohammed Al Yousaf, Oman’s Minister of Commerce, Industry, and Investment Promotion (MOCIIP).
2022 - Yusuff Ali, chairman of Lulu Group, has become the first Bahrain golden residency visa recipient.

References

Living people
1955 births
Businesspeople from Thrissur
20th-century Indian Muslims
Recipients of the Padma Shri in social work
Indian expatriates in the United Arab Emirates
Recipients of Pravasi Bharatiya Samman
Indian billionaires
Emirati people of Malayali descent